The Douglass Summer House is a historic home at Highland Beach, Anne Arundel County, Maryland, United States. It was built in 1894–95, is one of the first built in the small community of Highland Beach and is the oldest structure remaining at that place. The house was built in 1894-95 by Major Charles Douglass, son of Frederick Douglass (1818-1895). It is a -story Queen Anne style frame dwelling with a one-story wraparound porch and a corner tower. A meticulous renovation in 1987 by architect Charles Bohl maintained a majority of the original interior and exterior fabric of the building.

The Douglass Summer House was listed on the National Register of Historic Places in 1992.

References

External links
, including photo from 1990, at Maryland Historical Trust
Information at the Library of Congress.

Houses on the National Register of Historic Places in Maryland
Houses in Anne Arundel County, Maryland
African-American history of Maryland
Houses completed in 1895
National Register of Historic Places in Anne Arundel County, Maryland